Tsukisamu Dome (月寒ドーム) was an indoor arena located in Toyohira-ku, Sapporo, Hokkaido, Japan. The full capacity of the arena was 5,831.

Overview 
This facility was used for Agricultural show , car exhibitions and sales, concerts, sports events, and as a convention center.

The Tsukisamu Dome was closed in 2016 and demolished in 2018, because of the increasing cost of maintenance of this aging facility.

Access 
 Tōhō Line: 15 minutes walk (to the east) from Fukuzumi Station.

See also
Expo Hokkaido '82

References

External links
Home Page (Japanese)

Defunct indoor arenas in Japan
Levanga Hokkaido
Sports venues in Sapporo
Toyohira-ku, Sapporo
Sports venues demolished in 2018
Demolished buildings and structures in Japan
Sports venues completed in 1972
1972 establishments in Japan
2018 disestablishments in Japan